Honesdale is a borough in and the county seat of Wayne County, Pennsylvania, United States. The borough's population was 4,458 at the time of the 2020 census.

Located in a coal mining region, during the nineteenth century it was the starting point of the Delaware and Hudson Canal, which provided for transport of coal to Kingston, New York, and then down the Hudson River to New York City. In the 19th century, the expansion of railroads eventually superseded regular use of the canal.

History

The discovery of anthracite coal in northeastern Pennsylvania in the early 1800s and the need to transport this valuable fuel to New York City gave birth to the Delaware and Hudson Canal, the American Railroad, and the Borough of Honesdale. Honesdale was named for Philip Hone, former Mayor of New York and president of Honesdale's Delaware & Hudson (D&H) Canal Company. Honesdale, originally called "Dyberry Forks," was laid out as a village in 1826 when the D & H Canal was created. It was incorporated as a borough on January 28, 1831.

The Honesdale Residential Historic District and the D&H Canal are listed on the National Register of Historic Places.

Birthplace of American railroading

Honesdale is home to the first commercial steam locomotive run on rails in the United States, the Stourbridge Lion. On August 8, 1829, the Stourbridge Lion started in Honesdale, ran three miles to Seelyville, and returned; Honesdale, therefore, is known as the birthplace of the American Railroad.

The Stourbridge Lion, owned by the Delaware & Hudson (D&H) Canal Company was regrettably considered too heavy for further use. D&H transported anthracite coal from mines near Carbondale to New York City via Honesdale and Kingston, New York. Coal was moved by a unique gravity-railroad from the mines to Honesdale where it was transferred to barges and transported via a 108-mile canal to Kingston, New York, then shipped by river barges down the Hudson River to New York City.

What remained of the Stourbridge Lion passed into many hands over the coming years and was eventually acquired by the Smithsonian Institution in 1890. The main boiler is currently on loan at the Baltimore and Ohio Railroad Museum in Baltimore, Maryland.

The Wayne County Historical Society Museum contains a full-scale replica of the Stourbridge Lion; the Society also displays many historical photographs, artifacts and other exhibits. The D&H Railroad Company built the replica using original blueprints for the 1933 Century of Progress Exposition in Chicago. The replica was relocated to Honesdale in 1941.

Passenger excursions run seasonally from Honesdale to Hawley along the historic Stourbridge Line. The railroad runs twenty-five miles along the Lackawaxen River. Excursions depart from the platform at the Wayne County Visitors Center.

Geography
Honesdale is located at  (41.574214, -75.255966).

The waters contain fish and other aquatic life and attract hundreds of ducks, as well as eagles and other raptors.

Demographics

As of the census of 2010, there were 4,480 people, 2,086 households, and 1,147 families residing in the borough. The population density was 1,148.7 people per square mile (443.5/km2). There were 2,357 housing units at an average density of 604.4 per square mile (236.1/km2). The racial makeup of the borough was 96.8% White, 0.9% African American, 0.1% Native American, 0.4% Asian, 0.6% from other races, and 1.2% from two or more races. Hispanic or Latino of any race were 2.8% of the population.

There were 2,086 households, out of which 26.2% had children under the age of 18 living with them, 35.8% were married couples living together, 14.2% had a female householder with no husband present, and 45% were non-families. 39.2% of all households were made up of individuals, and 18.4% had someone living alone who was 65 years of age or older. The average household size was 2.15 and the average family size was 2.88.

In the borough the population was spread out, with 22.4% under the age of 18, 58.8% from 18 to 64, and 18.8% who were 65 years of age or older. The median age was 42 years.

The median income for a household in the borough was $32,644, and the median income for a family was $42,088. Males had a median income of $33,553 versus $30,179 for females. The per capita income for the borough was $20,122. About 19.1% of families and 19.6% of the population were below the poverty line, including 33.4% of those under age 18 and 10.7% of those age 65 or over.

Media and publications 
The daily newspaper, The Wayne Independent, was established at Honesdale in 1878, and emphasizes local stories. As of October 2019, The Wayne Independent is now The Tri-County Independent, its publisher having forced its merger with four former newspapers it owned.

The local radio stations are WDNH 95.3 FM and WPSN 104.3FM, 101.9FM and 1590am. In addition to local news, events, and weather, WPSN broadcasts the Honesdale Hornets High School football games every Friday night during football season.

The children's magazine Highlights for Children, a monthly magazine for children ages 6 to 12, was founded in Honesdale in 1946. The magazine features fiction stories, nonfiction articles, brainteasers, and puzzles, including Hidden Pictures puzzles. The publisher maintains its editorial headquarters on Church St. in Honesdale, while their business offices are in Columbus, Ohio. Highlights International's products are available in 40 countries and in 16 languages.

Yoga International, based in Honesdale, publishes online content on yoga, meditation, and mindful living. In 2018 Yoga International was recognized as the 122nd fastest growing private companies in the United States on Inc.'s 500|5000 list.

Education 
Honesdale High School is a public, four-year, regional high school serving grades 9-12 in Honesdale, as a part of the Wayne Highlands School District. The district includes four elementary schools, one middle school, and one high school. Stourbridge Primary Center and Lakeside Elementary School serves children from Honesdale, and Wayne Highlands Middle School serve grades 6-8 in Honesdale. In 2006, the district was recognized for excellence in teaching, and has a long tradition of requiring standards of its graduates well beyond state regulations.

Healthcare 
The hospital serving Honesdale and the surrounding communities is Wayne Memorial Hospital. Wayne Memorial Hospital is a non-profit, community-controlled hospital based in Honesdale with inpatient and outpatient care in more than 30 medical specialties. Wayne Memorial Hospital is the heart of Wayne Memorial Health System, which serves 100,000 people across Wayne and Pike Counties. The clinical affiliate, Wayne Memorial Community Health Centers, operates primary care services around the county, dental services, women’s health and behavioral health centers. A $40 million dollar expansion of the hospital was completed in 2019. The 85,000 square foot tower houses 50 private patient rooms and technology designed to reduce the risk for infection, enhance communication and decrease noise levels.

Places 
 Honesdale has hundreds of Victorian age structures, and features several tall church steeples, historically significant buildings of many kinds, and a memorial Central Park beside the Wayne County Courthouse. While current zoning laws do not require building remodelling to remain historically accurate, the vast majority of houses and structures remain architecturally as they were constructed, often more than a century past.
Honesdale was home to the Roman Catholic St. Vincent's Elementary School, located on Cliff Street. The school closed at the end of the 2008-2009 school year after declining enrollment. Nonetheless, two Catholic churches continue with vigorous participation, as do churches of other denominations and a synagogue.
 Irving Cliff, 300 feet high, named for Washington Irving who loved its prominence, overlooks the town and offers a compelling view of the confluence of the Lackawaxen River and Dyberry Creek and virtually everything else in the valley. The cliff is surmounted by Gibbons Memorial Park with a 50-foot electric framework for a Christmas Star and Easter Cross that are visible for miles during holiday nights. Fireworks are fired from the cliff for Independence Day festivities.
 Many summer camps are located in and around Honesdale, including Bryn Mawr Camp, Camp Cayuga, Camp IHC, formerly known as Indian Head Camp, Camp Lavi, Camp Morasha, Camp Moshava, formerly Camp Navajo, Camp Nesher, Camp Ramah in the Poconos, Camp Raninu, Camp Seneca Lake, Summit Camp, Camp Towanda, Trail's End Camp, Tyler Hill Camp, Camp Watonka, Camp Wayne and Camp Weequahic. Many campers travel from the New York Metropolitan Area, New England, Philadelphia and further afield to attend camps in the area, as they have for many decades. The camps are the county's largest industry.
 Cranker's Collection of Mechanical Marvels includes a private collection of classic cars mostly from the 1920s and 1930s. There are also several dance hall organs, Edison phonographs, and other music boxes from the 1800s.

Arts and culture 
The Wayne County Arts Alliance is a non-profit organization of volunteers interested in the benefits of arts in the county. One of its initiatives is The Great Wall of Honesdale, a large public art display at the intersection of 4th Street and Main Street. In addition, there are several murals along Honesdale’s Main Street and in its vicinity.

Honesdale hosts the annual Wayne County Fair, starting on the first Friday in August and spans nine days. It features typical county-fair events, such as concession stands, harness racing, livestock contests, amusement rides, and concerts. Nearly 100,000 visitors attend the fair each year.

The Honesdale Roots and Rhythm Music and Arts Festival is held throughout Honesdale on the third Saturday in June.  The main stage is set up along Court Street playing to festival goers in Central Park.  Artists and food vendors are lined along the park.  Several other stages are set up throughout the town offering music all day.

The Cooperage Project is housed in a restored barrel making factory. In 2019 the Cooperage Project held 350 events, including 65 musical and theater performances. Educational programs are also provided for all ages. The Main Street Farmers' Market, run from the facility, allows farmers to sell directly to the community.

The Himalayan Institute of Yoga Science and Philosophy is a non-profit organization providing yoga, meditation, and spiritual programs. The organization was founded in 1971 by Swami Rama, and its world headquarters are located in Honesdale. The Himalayan Institute has a number of humanitarian projects underway in Cameroon, India, and Mexico. In additional, the Himalayan Institute also operates Yoga International magazine.

Notable people
 Brian Balthazar, (born Brian Balthaser) television personality (born in Honesdale).
 John J. Boyle (1919-2003), 19th Public Printer of the United States (born in Honesdale)<ref>John J. Boyle, letter to Howard W. Cannon, reprinted in''' </ref>
 Florence Goodenough, born 1886, psychology pioneer in area of intelligence (born in Honesdale).
 Mary Dimmick Harrison (1858-1948), second wife of President Benjamin Harrison
 Edgar Jadwin (1865-1931), former Chief of Engineers, United States Army Corps of Engineers
 Frederick W. Keator (1855-1924), Episcopal bishop
 Lyman Lemnitzer (1899-1988), General, U.S. Army and former Chairman of the Joint Chiefs of Staff
 John Olver, former member of U.S. House of Representatives representing Massachusetts's 1st congressional district
 Kenneth Kreitner (b. 1956), American musicologist
 David M. Peterson (1894-1919), flying ace of World War I
 Richard B. Smith (1901-1935), co-wrote the song "Winter Wonderland" in 1934; his house still stands on Church St., Honesdale
 Lauren Spierer, missing woman, spent a summer at Camp Towanda and met friends who became part of her social circle at Indiana University
 Richard J. Tallman (1925-1972), U.S. Army Brigadier-General, killed in action in Vietnam in 1972
 Clarissa Tracy (1818–1905), botanist, taught here
 Art Wall Jr. (1923-2001), professional golfer, 1959 Masters champion
 Morris Wilkins, inventor of heart-shaped bathtub and champagne glass bathtub
 Q. David Bowers, born 1938, author and numismatist
 Ruth McGinnis, World Women’s Billiard Champion in the 1930s

In popular culture

Film
 Although the movie Playing for Keeps (1986) was filmed mainly in nearby Bethany, Pennsylvania, scenes were filmed at the old Miracle Market on 6th Street in Honesdale. Additional scenes were filmed in nearby Hawley, Pennsylvania, and a field along Pennsylvania State Route 191 near Lake Ariel, Pennsylvania. The movie was released on October 3, 1986, and starred Daniel Jordano, Matthew Penn, Leon W. Grant, Mary B. Ward and Marisa Tomei.
 The Long Kiss Goodnight (1996) is an action thriller film which stars Geena Davis and Samuel L. Jackson. Davis plays a Honesdale schoolteacher-wife-mother who suffers from amnesia, and who eventually learns that she was a trained assassin before losing her memory. Although Honesdale is mentioned in the film, the film was not shot in Honesdale.
 Wet Hot American Summer (2001) is a camp-set comedy directed by David Wain. The movie was shot mainly at Camp Towanda in Honesdale with some photography taking place in Honesdale's downtown.
 Honesdale is mentioned in the opening scene of the movie The Ten (2007), starring Paul Rudd of Wet Hot American Summer.
 Blue Valentine (2010), starring Ryan Gosling and Michelle Williams, started filming in Honesdale and the surrounding areas in spring 2009, and was released in the United States on December 26, 2010.
 44 Pages (2017) is a documentary film about the Highlights for Children editorial offices was filmed in Honesdale. The documentary focuses on the efforts of publishing a magazines each month, as well as the letters received and answered from children around the world.

Television
 Schrute Farms, the bed and breakfast beet farm belonging to Dwight Schrute on NBC's sitcom The Office, is listed as a Honesdale establishment on TripAdvisor.com.
 In Season 4, Episode 5 of NBC's sitcom The Office (Heavy Competition), a card from Michael's Rolodex shows the address of Shrute Farms as "Rural Rt. 6, Honesdale, PA 18431."
 The fifth episode of the Netflix documentary series Rotten'' features a Honesdale dairy farmer.

See also
 Glen Dyberry Cemetery, Honesdale

References

External links

 
 Honesdale Fire Department
 The Wayne County Historical Society & Museum
 Wayne County Fair

 
Boroughs in Wayne County, Pennsylvania
Pocono Mountains
County seats in Pennsylvania
Populated places established in 1826
1831 establishments in Pennsylvania